The following lists events that happened during 2011 in Kazakhstan.

Incumbents
President: Nursultan Nazarbayev
Prime Minister: Karim Massimov

Events

February
 February 2 – The parliament approved a bill giving the President the power to declare a snap presidential election.
 February 4 – President Nursultan Nazarbayev calls an early election for April 3, rejecting a plan for a referendum intended to allow him to rule for another decade.

April
 April 3 – A presidential election takes place in the country, with incumbent President Nursultan Nazarbayev winning 95% of the vote.
 April 8 – Nursultan Nazarbayev is sworn in as President of Kazakhstan for another five-year term, in a vote criticized as flawed.

December
 December 16 - The Zhanaozen massacre took place in Kazakhstan's western Mangystau Region.

References

 
2010s in Kazakhstan
Years of the 21st century in Kazakhstan
Kazakhstan
Kazakhstan
Kazakhstan